Wingham railway station may refer to:

Wingham (Canterbury Road) railway station - former station on the East Kent Light Railway
Wingham Colliery railway station - former station on the East Kent Light Railway
Wingham railway station, New South Wales - current station on the Australian North Coast line
Wingham Town railway station - former station on the East Kent Light Railway